Juan Ramón Rivas Contreras (born March 16, 1966) is a Puerto Rican retired professional basketball player, and sports color commentator. Rivas was the third player from Puerto Rico to play in the NBA (after Butch Lee and José Ortiz), and half of the first duo of Puerto Ricans to be active in the NBA simultaneously (with Ortiz). Rivas has played in the NBA, NCAA Division I, and in the Puerto Rican National Superior League (BSN), with the Carolina Giants.

Rivas also played internationally, in Spain, Greece, and Italy. Rivas was also a member of the senior Puerto Rican National Basketball Team for several years.  He represented Puerto Rico at the following tournaments: the 1986 FIBA World Championship, in Málaga, Spain; the 1988 Summer Olympic Games, in Seoul, South Korea; the 1990 FIBA World Championship, in Buenos Aires, Argentina; the 1992 Summer Olympic Games, in Barcelona, Spain; and the 1996 Summer Olympics, in Atlanta, United States.

Biography

Early years
As a youngster, Rivas played at The San Juan Y.M.C.A, for Millin Romero. He progressed through Carolina's minor basketball tournaments, becoming one of the best centers in Puerto Rico, while he played for Levittown's Pedro Albizu Campos High School's team. Flor Melendez took note of his progress, and signed him to play for the Carolina Giants, of Puerto Rico's top-tier level league, the BSN. That year he was selected BSN Rookie of the Year.

The changes on the Carolina Giants were evident, when Rivas joined the team: From being one of the worst teams in the league, during the 1983 tournament, they got better every year. In 1987, the team almost reached the BSN playoffs, and, in 1988, the team finally reached the BSN playoffs, for the first time, having the best record in the regular season (1989 Regular Season: PPG.24.4, Reb.17.4 in 30 games).

College career
Rivas attended Temple University, where he played NCAA Division I college basketball with the Temple Owls, from 1984 to 1988, going on four occasions to the NCAA post season tournament. He was coached by Hall of Fame head coach John Chaney. Temple was ranked 1st in the nation in his senior year, with a record of 34 wins and 2 losses. Playing with the Owls helped him gain experience, and improve his game in the NCAA. He became well-known in the United States, as a center who could score points, and rebound in double figures, and was a respected player among his peers.

Professional career

Signed by the NBA
Thanks to his notable NCAA Division I college basketball career, the Boston Celtics announced that they would sign Rivas for a full season, towards the end of the 1988 Summer Olympic Games, in Seoul. Having coincided with José Ortiz's signing by the Utah Jazz two weeks prior, Rivas' signing by the Celtics was a cause of great celebration for Puerto Ricans, many of whom felt their efforts in basketball were finally being recognized by the NBA.

With the Celtics, Rivas had the opportunity to share playing time alongside Larry Bird, Kevin McHale, Dennis Johnson, Robert Parish, Reggie Lewis, and Brian Shaw, among others. The Celtics reached the playoffs, by beating the Washington Bullets by two games, for the eighth and final playoff spot in the NBA east that year, but were swept in three games, by the eventual champion Detroit Pistons, in the playoffs' first round.

Because of his height, Rivas had to change playing positions when he arrived to the Celtics, going from playing center in Puerto Rico, to power forward in Boston.

After that season with the Celtics, he came back to Puerto Rico, and received his first Puerto Rican League MVP honor, while playing for the Carolina Giants. That summer, he was signed by a basketball club in Spain, called Taugrés, which became his home for the next 7 years.

Europe
Rivas played for Taugrés in the Spanish League from 1989 until 1996, winning the Spanish King's Cup in 1995. He arrived with the Vitorian team to the FIBA European Cup (later called FIBA Saporta Cup) Finals in three consecutive years (1994, 1995, 1996) finally winning it in the 1995–96 season, against Peja Stojaković's team PAOK, and becoming the Finals MVP, with 32 points and 15 rebounds. In the 1996–97 season, he won the Spanish league with FC Barcelona and also finished runner-up of the 1996–97 FIBA EuroLeague, losing to Olympiacos from Greek Basket League. The following season went to Athens to play for AEK of Giannis Ioannidis, one of the biggest clubs in Greece, and played in another EuroLeague Final (1997–98 FIBA EuroLeague) against Ettore Messina's Kinder Bologna. In 1998, he went back to Spain, for his final year with the club Cáceres. In 1999, he played in Italy for the club Fabriano.

National team career
Rivas represented Puerto Rico, as a member of the senior Puerto Rican national basketball team, at the 1988 Summer Olympic Games, in Seoul, South Korea, the 1992 Summer Olympic Games, held at Barcelona, Spain, and the 1996 Summer Olympic Games, held in Atlanta. He also won the gold medal at the 1991 Pan American Games, and he also played at the 1986 FIBA World Championship, and the 1990 FIBA World Championship.

Sports commentator
Rivas worked for the Orlando Magic for 9 years, as a sports broadcasting color analyst, and for 5 years, for Fox Sports in Spanish. He worked as a TV sports color analyst at the Summer Olympic Games of Beijing 2008, and the Summer Olympic Games of London 2012, next to Edgar Lopez, for NBC Telemundo.

References

External links 
acb.com
baskonia.com
nba.com
basketballreference.com
basket-stats.info
basketball-reference.com
puertorico-herald.org

1966 births
Living people
1986 FIBA World Championship players
AEK B.C. players
Baloncesto Superior Nacional players
Basketball players at the 1988 Summer Olympics
Basketball players at the 1992 Summer Olympics
Basketball players at the 1996 Summer Olympics
Boston Celtics players
Centers (basketball)
Liga ACB players
National Basketball Association broadcasters
Olympic basketball players of Puerto Rico
People from Carolina, Puerto Rico
Power forwards (basketball)
Puerto Rican men's basketball players
1990 FIBA World Championship players
Puerto Rico men's national basketball team players
Puerto Rican expatriate sportspeople in Spain
Saski Baskonia players
Spanish men's basketball players
Temple Owls men's basketball players
Undrafted National Basketball Association players